Machine Fucking Head Live is the third live album by American heavy metal band Machine Head. And it is the final release to include bassist Adam Duce who was fired, due to ongoing differences on February 11, 2013.   The album was released on November 13, 2012, under Roadrunner Records. It was recorded at Central, Manchester on December 6, 2011 (except Locust & Halo recorded at SECC, Glasgow on December 5, 2011). "The Head Cases [Machine Head's nickname for their fans] have been so intense on this tour cycle that we had to start capturing the shows, especially with technology making it so much easier to record," said frontman Robb Flynn. "We culled some of the best nights where the band and crowd were on fire and made a badass, nearly two-hour, double live album, which is a great documentation of where the band is at, 18 years deep."

Track listing

Personnel
Machine Head
Robb Flynn – lead vocals,  rhythm guitar
Phil Demmel – lead guitar, backing vocals
Adam Duce – bass, backing vocals
Dave McClain – drums

Charts

References

2012 albums
Machine Head (band) albums
Roadrunner Records live albums